Spilomela minoralis is a moth in the family Crambidae. It is found in Guyana. It has also been reported from Cuba.

The wingspan is about 20 mm. The forewings are semihyaline white with a fuscous brown subbasal band, a slightly curved antemedial band and a postmedial band which is connected to a patch at the tornus. There is also a wedge-shaped terminal patch, divided by a white subterminal line. The hindwings are semihyaline white with oblique fuscous medial and postmedial bands, as well as a subterminal and terminal band.

References

Moths described in 1912
Spilomelinae
Taxa named by George Hampson